Anderson da Silva (born 19 September 1970), better known as Sonny Anderson, is a Brazilian former professional footballer who played as a striker. A prolific goalscorer at the club level, he was best known for his spells with Lyon, Monaco (he played most of his abroad career in France, amassing Ligue 1 totals of 221 matches and 138 goals) and Barcelona. He participated with Brazil in the 2001 Confederations Cup, and won a total of six caps for his country, scoring one goal.

Club career
Born in Goiatuba, Goiás, Anderson started playing professionally with CR Vasco da Gama, but failed to make an early impression. After failing to score in 18 matches in his last year, he moved to Guarani.

Anderson's first abroad experience came with Servette FC, and his impact was instant, scoring 18 goals in his first season then helping the club to the national league in the following by netting 11 in just the first half of the campaign, as he left in January 1994 to Olympique de Marseille.

After six months, with L'OM relegated due to a bribery scandal, Anderson moved to fellow Ligue 1 side AS Monaco FC, scoring at an equally impressive pace and winning team (1997 league) and individual accolades alike.

In 1997, Anderson joined FC Barcelona: having to battle for first-choice status with the likes of Luis Enrique and Patrick Kluivert, he fared well, scoring ten times in La Liga alone in his first season, as the Catalans won the double. In his second year, which included some run-ins with manager Louis Van Gaal, he played less, which prompted a return to France with rising Olympique Lyonnais, for approximately €18 million. He would be a very important attacking figure as the team won the first two of seven consecutive national championships.

Aged 33, free agent Anderson returned to Spain with Villarreal CF. In his only full campaign he scored 12 times, including against Real Madrid (1–0, after only two minutes on the pitch), former club Barcelona (2–1, in the 89th minute) and Valencia CF (1–0), while also helping the Yellow Submarine to the semifinals of the UEFA Cup.

After being instrumental in Villarreal's 2004 UEFA Intertoto Cup win, Anderson finished his career in Qatar. He then returned to Lyon, going on work with the team's strikers.

In June 2007, Anderson played a farewell match at the Stade de Gerland, in a match facing his friends and the 2002 French champions. Four years later he rescinded his link with Lyon and started a coaching career, joining Neuchâtel Xamax in Switzerland. On 24 July, after only two league games, he was sacked.

International career
Anderson could not translate his club success to the international front. He only won six caps for the Brazil side, the first coming in a friendly against South Korea on 11 August 1997, in which he scored his only international goal. He was also a member of the team that took part at the 2001 FIFA Confederations Cup, and obtained his final international cap that same year.

Career statistics

Club

Honours
Vasco da Gama
Campeonato Brasileiro Série A: 1989

Servette
Swiss Super League: 1993–94

Monaco
Ligue 1: 1996–97

Barcelona
La Liga: 1997–98, 1998–99
Copa del Rey: 1997–98
UEFA Super Cup: 1997

Lyon
Ligue 1: 2001–02, 2002–03
Coupe de la Ligue: 2000–01
Trophée des Champions: 2002

Villarreal
UEFA Intertoto Cup: 2003, 2004
Individual
Swiss Super League Top Scorer: 1992–93
Swiss Super League Best Foreign Player: 1992–93
Ligue 1 Top Scorer: 1995–96, 1999–2000, 2000–01
Ligue 1 Étoile d'Or: 1995–96
Ligue 1 Best Player: 1996–97
UEFA Cup Top Scorer: 2003–04 (6 goals)
Qatar Stars League Top Scorer: 2004–05 (20 goals)

References

External links

Official website (archived) 

1970 births
Living people
Sportspeople from Goiás
Brazilian footballers
Association football forwards
Campeonato Brasileiro Série A players
CR Vasco da Gama players
Guarani FC players
Swiss Super League players
Servette FC players
Ligue 1 players
Olympique de Marseille players
AS Monaco FC players
Olympique Lyonnais players
La Liga players
FC Barcelona players
Villarreal CF players
Qatar Stars League players
Al-Rayyan SC players
Al-Gharafa SC players
Brazil youth international footballers
Brazil under-20 international footballers
Brazil international footballers
2001 FIFA Confederations Cup players
Brazilian expatriate footballers
Expatriate footballers in Switzerland
Expatriate footballers in France
Expatriate footballers in Monaco
Expatriate footballers in Spain
Expatriate footballers in Qatar
Brazilian expatriate sportspeople in Switzerland
Brazilian expatriate sportspeople in France
Brazilian expatriate sportspeople in Monaco
Brazilian expatriate sportspeople in Spain
Brazilian expatriate sportspeople in Qatar
Brazilian football managers
Brazilian expatriate football managers
Expatriate football managers in Switzerland
Neuchâtel Xamax FCS managers